Anthony James Leon (born 15 December 1956) is a South African politician who served as leader of the opposition from 1999-2007 as leader of the Democratic Alliance (DA). He led the DA from its inception in 2000, until his retirement from leadership in 2007. Before that, he led the Democratic Party from 1994. He is the longest serving leader of the official opposition in parliament since the advent of democracy in 1994. Although still a member of the DA, he served as the South African Ambassador to Argentina under the ANC government from 2009 to 2012.

Since 2012, Leon has been serving as Executive Chairman of Resolve Communications (Pty) Ltd - a South African-based advocacy for reputation management and strategic communications consultancy, and a consultant to various international companies. Leon is also a contracted columnist to Arena Holdings Ltd, with his columns appearing weekly or monthly in Business Day, Sunday Times, and Business Live. He is also the author of five books.

Early life
Leon was born and raised in Durban during the apartheid era. He was educated at Clifton School (Durban) and Kearsney College near Durban. His father Ramon Leon was a High Court Judge. Both his parents were active in the liberal, anti-apartheid Progressive Party (which later became the Democratic Party). He is Jewish.

Political career
In 1974 at the age of 18 he became an organiser for the Progressive Party, one of the two opposition parties represented in parliament at the time. After this, he qualified as an attorney at the University of the Witwatersrand, where he was President of the Law Students' Council and Vice-President of the Students' Representative Council, and became a lecturer in the Law Department in 1986. He has accredited Harry Schwarz and Helen Suzman as his biggest inspirations. In the same year he was elected to the Johannesburg City Council for Yeoville. When the results for the election were released, it was announced that the NP candidate Sam Bloomberg had won. However Harry Schwarz, his political mentor, uncovered that this was untrue, and Leon was declared the winner. He became leader of the opposition in the city council.

In 1989 he was elected to Parliament for the Houghton constituency, representing the Progressive Party's successor, the Democratic Party.

From 1990 to 1994 he chaired the DP's Bill of Rights Commission, and as such was an advisor to the Convention for a Democratic South Africa (CODESA) and a delegate to the multi-party negotiations that led to the end of apartheid and the establishment of a non-racial democracy in 1994.

At the 1994 general elections, Leon was again elected to Parliament in the first democratic National Assembly, as well as leader of the Democratic Party. At the time, the Democratic Party was perceived as merely a minor party of white liberals, an oddity in the first non-racial democratic government of South Africa. Yet between 1994 and 1999 its seven members managed to become the most vocal, active and involved legislators.

In 1998, Leon published his first book on the eve of the second democratic election, entitled 'Hope & Fear: Reflections of a Democrat' (Jonathan Ball, 1998). With the second democratic elections in 1999 and the New National Party only retaining 28 seats (down from 82 in 1994), he became Leader of the Opposition as the DP took 38 seats, showing a growth of over five-fold.

After the 2004 general elections, the DA under Leon had a vote increased by 2.8%, as did the ANC with an increase of 3.3%. These gains came at a cost to three of the five minor opposition parties, with only the Independent Democrats – a newcomer in the elections – also attracting support.

Leon built a high media profile as opposition leader by criticising the ANC government under Nelson Mandela but more so under his successor, President Thabo Mbeki.

Post Politics
On 26 November 2006, Leon announced that he would step down from the leadership of the DA in 2007, and would not accept nomination for the leadership of the party at the party's congress in May 2007. He officially stepped down at that conference, and Helen Zille was elected to be the new party leader on 6 May 2007. Leon, nevertheless, kept his seat in Parliament until 2009, when its term expired.

One of South Africa's leading political commentator, Justice Malala wrote about him: "Every South African should wake up today and say a little thank you to Tony Leon ... he was fearless when many were fearful, vocal when many had lost their voices, openly critical when many would only speak in whispers ... the man has done a remarkable job."

Leon was voted 16th in the TV channel SABC3's Top 100 Great South Africans.

From September to December 2007, Leon was a Fellow at the Institute of Politics at Harvard's John F. Kennedy School of Government.

On 29 November 2007, Mr. Leon was a guest at the prestigious Yale Political Union, keynoting a student debate on the topic "Resolved: The Nation Should Not Be Tied To Ethnicity." After a vigorous debate, the motion passed.

In 2008, Leon released his autobiography 'On the Contrary'. The book was favourably received, The Economist  describing it as "eloquent, funny and rich... an important record of South Africa’s young democracy, witnessed from the other side of the fence". The book was also serialized by the Johannesburg Sunday Times. The book won the Recht Malan Prize in the Via Afrika Book Awards for the best work of non-fiction in 2009.

In the last quarter of 2008 Leon was a visiting fellow at the Cato Institute Center for Liberty and Global Prosperity in Washington DC. His research paper: The State of Liberal Democracy in Africa - Resurgence or Recession was published in May 2010.

Leon published a series of articles in Business Day from the campaign trail of the 2009 South African general election.

After Leon completed his over 20 years as an MP, he was invited to write two weekly columns in leading South African Sunday paper "Sunday Times" and in leading daily paper "Business Day", winning excellent reviews for his writing and analysis even from previous political opponents.

Since 2012, Leon has been a contracted columnist to Arena Holdings Ltd with his columns appearing weekly or monthly in Business Day, Sunday Times, and the Business Live, respectively.

South African ambassadorship and return to South Africa
In August 2009, President Zuma appointed Leon as Ambassador to Argentina, Uruguay and Paraguay. After receiving diplomatic training, Leon took up his post in September. Leon followed many DA and Democratic Party members who became ambassadors, such as Harry Schwarz, Zach de Beer, Douglas Gibson and Sandra Botha.

On his return in January 2013, he was awarded a fellowship at the Stellenbosch Institute for Advance Study (STIAS). He wrote a paper entitled 'Where in the World is South Africa?', which was subsequently published in the South African journal of International Affairs, 2013, Vol.20, No.3,447-457 Leon also published a memoir of his ambassadorial life titled 'The Accidental Ambassador: From Parliament to Patagonia' (Pan MacMillan, 2013). The book received critical acclaim with Business Day, where it was said to be "fascinating... Leon is an excellent writer and recounter... eloquent and heartwarming." (Sue Grant-Marshall). The Cape Times described the book as "intelligent, engaging and incredibly funny" (Shaun Swingler).

Nelson Mandela

Shortly after former President Nelson Mandela's death in December 2013, Tony Leon published yet another book, this time concerning Mandela's presidency and leadership from the perspective of the parliamentary opposition. 'Opposite Mandela: Encounters with South Africa's Icon' was published in May 2014 by Jonathan Ball Publishers. Sue Grant-Marshall in Business Day wrote: "It is no surprise that in the year after Mandela's death a cascade of books by those who know the international icon are flooding the shops and bookshelves. Leave space for this one - it's written from Leon's particular perspective as Mandela's political opponent. It does not disappoint in this, his fourth book, for he tells fascinating tales with characteristic frankness and vigour."

New Book: Future Tense, Reflections of My Troubled Land, 2021. 
In March 2021, Jonathan Ball Publishers released Tony Leon's latest book: Future Tense - Reflections on My Troubled Land. Drawing from his vantage points of years in active politics and his subsequent career as an opinion former and columnist, this book captures and analyses recent South African history, with a focus on the squandered and corrupted years of the past decade. It also provides an insider view, for the first time, of the power struggles within the Democratic Alliance and plots the country's likely future trajectory. The book was favourably reviewed by Niall Ferguson.

Personal life
In 2000, Leon married Michal (formerly Even-Zahav) from Israel, the mother of his two stepchildren, Noa and Etai Even-Zahav.

References

External links
Democratic Alliance website
Personal website
 On The Contrary - Tony Leon's latest book 
 Tony Leon's Book at Exclusive Books
 South African Embassy in Buenos Aires, Argentina

1956 births
Living people
Alumni of Kearsney College
White South African people
Harvard Kennedy School staff
Democratic Alliance (South Africa) politicians
Jewish South African politicians
Members of the National Assembly of South Africa
Progressive Party (South Africa) politicians
Democratic Party (South Africa) politicians
Members of the House of Assembly (South Africa)
Ambassadors of South Africa to Argentina
Ambassadors of South Africa to Paraguay
Ambassadors of South Africa to Uruguay